Robert James Johnson (27 March 1905 – 1987) was an English footballer who scored 15 goals from 39 appearances in the Football League playing as a centre forward or outside right for Southport and Darlington. He also played in Ireland for Derry City, was on the books of Barnsley, without playing for them in the League, and played non-league football for clubs including Ushaw Moor, Moor Ends Thorne, Firbeck Colliery, Spennymoor United, Thorne Colliery, Eden Colliery and Walker Celtic.

References

1905 births
1987 deaths
Sportspeople from Chester-le-Street
Footballers from County Durham
English footballers
Association football forwards
Ushaw Moor F.C. players
Firbeck Main F.C. players
Spennymoor United F.C. players
Southport F.C. players
Derry City F.C. players
Darlington F.C. players
Barnsley F.C. players
Walker Celtic F.C. players
Thorne Colliery F.C. players
Eden Colliery Welfare F.C. players
English Football League players
Place of death missing
Date of death missing